William Christopher Carter (born September 16, 1982), nicknamed "Animal", is an American former Major League Baseball outfielder who played for the Boston Red Sox and New York Mets between 2008 and 2010. He also played for the Saitama Seibu Lions of Nippon Professional Baseball.

Career

High school
Carter attended De La Salle High School in Concord, California, and graduated in 2001. He hit for a batting average of .571 and led the league in home runs as a senior, and was named his team's MVP. He also was named a 2001 Preseason First Team All-American by Baseball America and Bay Valley Athletic League MVP in 2001.

He was twice selected as North Coast Section High School Sports Focus Scholar-Athlete of the Year (2000, '01) and earned honorable mention All-American honors from USA Today as a junior in 2000.

His father, Bill Carter, was his high school coach.

College
Carter attended Stanford University, where he majored in human biology and was Pre-Med, graduating in just three years. He was mainly a designated hitter for the team, and played some outfield as well. In 2002 and 2003, he played collegiate summer baseball in the Cape Cod Baseball League for the Yarmouth-Dennis Red Sox.

Minor leagues
Carter was drafted as a first baseman and outfielder by the Arizona Diamondbacks in the 17th round (506th overall) of the 2004 Major League Baseball Draft.

In , Carter played for the Single-A Yakima Bears and South Bend Silver Hawks. In , he played for the Single-A Lancaster JetHawks and Double-A Tennessee Smokies.

After expressing a desire to be traded, Carter was traded by the Diamondbacks on August 21, 2007, to the Washington Nationals for Emiliano Fruto. He was subsequently sent to the Red Sox as the player to be named later in the August 17 trade of Wily Mo Peña from the Red Sox to the Nationals. After the trade, Carter was assigned to Triple-A Pawtucket.

On November 20, 2007, Carter was placed on the Red Sox 40-man roster.

Boston Red Sox
Carter made his major league debut on June 5, 2008. He went 2-for-3 with two runs scored after entering the game when Coco Crisp was ejected in the second inning. With the Red Sox facing a possible Crisp suspension and injuries to both Jacoby Ellsbury and Manny Ramírez, Carter was sent back to Pawtucket on June 6 in favor of Brandon Moss.

In the 2009 season, Carter made the Red Sox Opening Day roster. He filled the final spot on the bench until Mark Kotsay returned from the disabled list.

New York Mets
Carter was traded to the New York Mets as a player to be named later in the deal for Billy Wagner, and was then added to the 40-man roster. During spring training, Carter was given the nickname "The Animal" by Mets manager Jerry Manuel for his relentless drive and work ethic.

On May 10, 2010, the Mets promoted Carter from the Buffalo Bisons to fill Frank Catalonotto's roster spot. On May 11, 2010, his first at-bat as a Met, in the bottom of the eighth inning, he hit a double that drove in the winning run against the Washington Nationals.

On June 11, 2010, Carter hit his first major league home run against Baltimore Orioles pitcher Jeremy Guthrie as the designated hitter. Two days later, Carter, again playing DH, hit his second home run against Orioles pitcher Kevin Millwood.

Carter agreed a minor league contract with the Tampa Bay Rays on January 6, 2011. He opted out of his contract on June 16.

Atlanta Braves
Carter signed a minor league contract with the Atlanta Braves on June 18, 2011.

Saitama Seibu Lions
On March 3, 2012, Carter signed with the Saitama Seibu Lions of the Pacific League of Nippon Professional Baseball. Carter was waived by the Lions after the 2012 season.

In the first part of 2013 he played for the semi-professional Ishikawa Million Stars in the independent Baseball Challenge League. On June 16, 2013, it was announced that Carter would be returning to the Saitama Seibu Lions.

References

External links

1982 births
Living people
Acereros de Monclova players
American expatriate baseball players in Japan
American expatriate baseball players in Mexico
Azucareros del Este players
American expatriate baseball players in the Dominican Republic
Baseball players from California
Boston Red Sox players
Bravos de Margarita players
Buffalo Bisons (minor league) players
Durham Bulls players
Gwinnett Braves players
Ishikawa Million Stars players
Lancaster JetHawks players
Major League Baseball left fielders
Major League Baseball right fielders
Mexican League baseball first basemen
Mexican League baseball left fielders
Mexican League baseball right fielders
New York Mets players
Nippon Professional Baseball first basemen
Pawtucket Red Sox players
People from Fremont, California
Saitama Seibu Lions players
South Bend Silver Hawks players
Sportspeople from the San Francisco Bay Area
Stanford Cardinal baseball players
Stanford University alumni
Tennessee Smokies players
Tiburones de La Guaira players
American expatriate baseball players in Venezuela
Tigres de Aragua players
Tucson Sidewinders players
Vaqueros Laguna players
Yakima Bears players
Yarmouth–Dennis Red Sox players
De La Salle High School (Concord, California) alumni